The Korea Internet & Security Agency (KISA) is the Ministry of Science and ICT's sub-organization dealing with the allocation and maintenance of South Korea's IPv4/IPv6 address space (and the related WHOIS information), Autonomous System Numbers, and the .kr country code top-level domain (ccTLD), and also responsible for cybersecurity of the Internet within South Korea, and runs the Korea Computer Emergency Response Team Coordination Center, a.k.a. KrCERT/CC, for the private sector of the country. Other roles include, but are not limited to, promotion of safe Internet usage and Internet culture, detecting and analyzing malware/virus on the web, privacy protection, operating root CA, education on Internet and cybersecurity, and various other cybersecurity issues.

The organization was created in July 2009, as three different agencies were merged into one organization: the Korea Information Security Agency (KISA), the National Internet Development Agency (NIDA) and the Korean IT International Cooperation Agency (KIICA).

KISA is the only Internet and Information Security promotion organization in Korea with an aim to improve global competitiveness of Korea’s Internet industry. KISA has set ‘Internet promotion’ for the future and ‘Information Security’ for the safety as its primary tasks and is focusing on enhancing the information security capacity of Korea’s ICT industry and expanding global cooperative partnership based on the K-ICT Security Development Strategy.

KrCERT/CC, which is an internal division of KISA, is a CSIRT with national responsibility and a focal point of contact for Korea on international cybersecurity incident handling. It cooperates and interacts locally with National Cyber Security Center in National Intelligence Service of Korea, and relevant stakeholders including local Internet service providers, cybersecurity vendors, and so on. It also interacts with other national CSIRTs and global cybersecurity vendors. The KrCERT/CC has memberships of Asia Pacific Computer Emergency Response Team, APCERT, and Forum of Incident Response and Security Teams, FIRST.

KISA also has 4 regional offices overseas. They are located in Oman for Middle East region, in Indonesia for Southeast Asia, Costa Rica for Latin America and Caribbean, and in Tanzania for Africa. Their roles are to facilitate inter-governmental cooperation including B2B/B2G/G2B and to introduce the talented Korean cybersecurity enterprises to global market.

See also
National Cyber Security Center (South Korea)
National Cyber Security Centre (disambiguation) in other countries

References

External links 
 Official web site

Internet in South Korea
Computer security organizations
Government agencies of South Korea